Spermatozopsis is a genus of green algae in the class Chlorophyceae.

References

External links

Chlamydomonadales genera
Chlamydomonadales